Michael Thomas Mauldin (born October 30, 1953) is an American media proprietor and record executive. He is CEO of Mauldin Brand AC/VC and serves as Chairman for the Black American Music Association; a 501(c)(6) trade association. He is also the Managing Director for 2475 AtVille Entertainment. Mauldin is owner of Air Control Music publishing and he is a live event producer and CEO of Scream Nation, a concert tour joint venture for the world famous "Scream Tour".

Mauldin is former President of Columbia Records Black Music Division and former Senior Vice President of Columbia Records Group, a talent manager, and is the father of recording artist/producer/Hall of Fame songwriter Jermaine Dupri.

In 1993, Mauldin helped Jermaine Dupri (his then 19-year-old son) establish his record label So So Def Recordings and was instrumental in helping Dupri and the So So Def artists achieve worldwide acclaim. Mauldin is the executive producer of albums including JE Heartbreak II by Jagged Edge, Timeless, Uncovered/Covered, and Things That Lovers Do by Kenny Lattimore & Chante' Moore, Comin' from Where I'm From: Live & More by Anthony Hamilton, Beware of Dog (album), Doggy Bag, and Heartthrobs Live by Bow Wow, Jump/Lil Boys in Da Hood by Kris Kross, Off the Hook by Xscape, 12 Soulful Nights of Christmas, and Like Mike (soundtrack).  Most recently he is noted as an executive producer for "Amplified"; a seductive digital entertainment show, addressing the state of Black American Music; its foundation, preservation and innovation.

Early life
Born and raised in Murphy, North Carolina, Mauldin later left Murphy for Atlanta, Georgia at the age of 20.

Career
Beginning in 1976, Mauldin was a roadie for the disco, jazz, funk band "Brick".  He later helmed a successful tour production & management business, with acts & clients including Cameo, The S.O.S. Band, Sister Sledge, The Reddings, Earth, Wind & Fire, Anita Baker, The original "New York City Fresh Fest", Luther Vandross. and more.

As President of Columbia Records, Mauldin directed the early careers of "Destiny's Child" (adding "Child" to be used in their stage name) and "Alicia Keys" (adding "Keys" to Alicia's stage name).  Mauldin oversaw numerous multi-platinum releases from artists including Maxwell, Fugees, Lauryn Hill, Wyclef Jean, Nas, Men In Black soundtrack, Love Jones soundtrack and more.

References

External links

[ Michael Mauldin discography credits as executive producer/producer, management, direction at AllMusic.com]

1953 births
Living people
American music industry executives
American music managers
Businesspeople from Atlanta
Businesspeople from North Carolina
Music promoters
Record producers from North Carolina
Record producers from Georgia (U.S. state)
Sony Music
Columbia Records
African-American record producers
African-American businesspeople
People from Murphy, North Carolina
21st-century African-American people
20th-century African-American people